Lamékaha may refer to:
Lamékaha, Poro, Savanes District, Ivory Coast
Lamékaha, Tchologo, Savanes District, Ivory Coast